The Missing Link is the title of the fourth release by former Sunny Day Real Estate frontman Jeremy Enigk. The album was self-produced by Enigk and Josh Myers and mastered at West West Side Music by Kimberly Rosen. The album was made available for download through the iTunes Store on August 14, 2007, and was officially released on August 21, 2007.

Tracks 5–9 are new recordings of songs that appear on Enigk's album World Waits. The versions on The Missing Link were recorded live at Sony Studios.

Track listing
"Oh John" – 3:45
"Chewing Gum" – 4:35
"Tatseo Show" – 2:34
"On the Wayside" – 4:06
"River to Sea" – 3:22
"Been Here Before" – 4:09
"Canons" – 4:00
"Dare a Smile" – 2:56
"World Waits" – 5:05

Credits
Jason Bringle – Drum Programming
Joel Brown – Engineer
Jenna Conrad – Cello
Jeremy Enigk – Bass, Guitar, Piano, Keyboards, Vocals, Producer, Engineer, Mixing
Casey Foubert – Engineer
Adrianna Hulscher – Violin
Matt Johnson – Drums
Kevin Krentz – Cello
Nick Macri – Bass
Nathan Medina – Viola
Josh Myers – Guitar, Mandolin, Arranger, Keyboards, Vocals, Producer, Engineer, Orchestration, Mixing
Dave Pauls – Design
Kimberly Rosen – Mastering
Coral Sepúlveda – Violin
Robert Shahnazarian, Jr. – Engineer, Mixing
Austin Sousa – Engineer
Greg Suran – Engineer
Eileen Swanson – Viola
Kanaan Tupper – Drums

External links
Official website

References

2007 albums
Jeremy Enigk albums